PFR may refer to:

Science and technology
 Plug flow reactor model, a reactor simulation model
 Prototype Fast Reactor, a nuclear reactor at Dounreay
 PFR, Phosphate Flame Retardant, a type of Flame Retardant
 pFR, a form of the light-sensing pigment phytochrome found in plants
 pFR, polymeric Flame Retardant, a type of Flame Retardant

Other
 PFR (band) (Pray for Rain), a Christian music group
 Partito Fascista Repubblicano, a former political party in Italy
 Pontefract Baghill railway station, England; National Rail station code PFR
 PFFR, an alternative rock group
 Portable Font Resource
 Pork fried rice, a Chinese dish
 Pro-Football-Reference.com, a website cataloging statistics for the National Football League and other professional American football leagues
 Persons and Family Relations, one of the subjects covered in Civil Law on the Philippine Bar Examinations
 Power finesse ratio, a statistic for baseball pitchers